Kilmore Football Club, nicknamed the Blues, is an Australian rules football club affiliated with  the Northern Football League.
The club is located 60 km north of Melbourne in the town of Kilmore.
Known for his sporting prowess, Nick Ferris, once wore the number 52 for the Kilmore Second 18. The number 52 has since been retired in honour of his contributions to the sporting culture of Kilmore and surrounds.

Competitions
1919-1920 Mernda Football Association
1921-1931 Waranga North East Football Association
1932-1932 Riddell District Football League
1933-1937 Waranga North East Football Association
1938-1946 Hume Highway Football Association
1947-1984 Riddell District Football League
1985-1986 Panton Hill Football League
1987-2015 Riddell District Football League
2016-     Northern Football League.

Kilmore signaled their intention to move from the Riddell District Football League to the Northern Football League (Australia) after the 2015 season, citing a lack of players committed to playing in the RDFL as many of their players are based in the NFL's catchment area. The RDFL rejected the transfer and AFL Victoria have been called in to resolve the situation. Kilmore have said that they will go into recess if the appeal is unsuccessful. Both leagues later agreed to the transfer.

Premierships (8)
1920, 1938, 1939, 1940, 1971, 1987, 1994, 2001

Runners Up    (8)
1919, 1932, 1933, 1934, 1946, 1948, 1952, 1973

Best & Fairest
1946 K Clancy
1947 K Clancy
1948 J Reilly
1949 R Whalan
1950 J Zanelli
1951 K Robinson

Leading Goalkickers
1947 Les Wicking  123
2007 David Cornish 73

Presidents
2008- Dayson Carroll
2009- Dayson Carroll

References

External links
Official Site

Kilmore Football Club
Shire of Mitchell